Thomas G. Waites (born January 8, 1955) is an American actor and acting instructor born in Philadelphia, Pennsylvania. Waites runs an acting studio in New York City which is named for him. He has been a member of the Actors Studio since 1984.

Early life and education
Waites was born in Philadelphia, Pennsylvania, the son of Michael and Anne Waites. He completed grade school at Immaculate Conception and then high school at Bishop Egan in Fairless Hills, Pennsylvania. After one year at Bucks County Community College, he received a full scholarship for acting at the Juilliard School in New York City, where he studied as a member of the Drama Division's  (1974–1977). He received a B.A. degree in Writing from The New School and a Master of Fine Arts in Playwriting from the University of Iowa.

Career

When Waites was 21 years old, he was offered two movies simultaneously: Snowbound, directed by Robert Young, and Pity the Poor Soldier (the title has subsequently changed), directed by Bill Jersey. Despite the fact that he was offered twice the money for Snowbound, Waites chose Pity the Poor Soldier because it was in celebration of the centennial of the American Revolutionary War. Next Waites originated the role of Oliver Treefe in Simon Gray's world premiere of Molly, at the First Annual Spoleto Festival in Charleston, S.C. After this highly acclaimed performance he returned to NYC to be cast in the Joan Micklin Silver-produced On the Yard (1978), co-starring John Heard. Subsequently, he was offered a three-picture option deal with Paramount Pictures. After very strong critical notices Waites auditioned for and got a part in Walter Hill's The Warriors (1979) playing the character Fox. After disputes with the director, he was fired from this film. Subsequently, when the studio asked him where he wanted his billing he told them to remove his name completely, a decision Waites regrets. He has since reconciled with Walter Hill. Three weeks after being fired from The Warriors Tom auditioned with Al Pacino, and was cast as Jeff McCullough in the Norman Jewison film ...And Justice for All (1979). This began a long relationship with Pacino. The two worked together again in Shakespeare's Richard III, with Waites playing Richmond, where he received strong notices again. After that, Waites originated the role of Mitchell in Alan Bowne's Forty-Deuce Off-Broadway at the Perry Street Theatre. In 1982, Waites competed with  Matt Dillon and Kevin Bacon to land the role of Bobby in David Mamet's Pulitzer Prize-winning play, American Buffalo. Kurt Russell and John Carpenter saw his performance and cast him as Windows in the film The Thing (1982). Waites was cast in the Broadway premiere of Trafford Tanzi, a musical where he sang with Deborah Harry of Blondie fame. Next was Pastorale, the Obie Award-winning play by Debra Eisenberg starring Judith Ivey and Christine Estabrook, playing the character of Steve.

It was during this time that Tom met his namesake and singer Tom Waits, who generously taught Tom the song "Jersey Girl" on the guitar. Out of deference to the musician Tom Waits, this is when Tom added the G. to his professional name to offset any confusion between the two talented artists. Tom Waits even played the bass drum on a demo tape of Thomas G. Waites' music. Tom G. Waites began writing music and formed a band called The Pushups, playing gigs around NYC in clubs such as CBGB's, Limelight, Traxs, The Bitter End and even opening for The Smithereens.

In 1983, Waits joined The Mirror Theater Ltd’s Mirror Repertory Company, performing in numerous repertory productions Off-Broadway at St. Peters Church throughout various seasons. His work with The Mirror included one of the highlights of Tom's career: working with Geraldine Page in Clifford Odets' Paradise Lost in the role of Kewpie, originated by Elia Kazan.

The reviews from this show and a recommendation by Al Pacino got Tom the part of Ralph in Clifford Odets' Awake and Sing! and Sing on Broadway with actress Frances McDormand and actor Harry Hamlin. Tom was then cast in the role of Broud in The Clan of the Cave Bear (1986) with Daryl Hannah and James Remar. Terrible critical notices and a cold reception from the public combined to make Clan of the Cave Bear a less than career-building move. It was at this point that he met his future wife, Lisa Greenberg, with whom he has two children: Samuel Jackson Waites and Michaela Kate Waites. Tom next played Otis Price the baby-stealer in ABC's All My Children for approximately 9 months, while performing Israel Horovitz's North Shore Fish at the WPA Theater in NYC alongside John Pankow, Christine Estabrook, Wendie Malick and Laura San Giacomo. Tom also made guest appearances in such popular television shows as Kojak (with Telly Savalas), Miami Vice and two episodes of The Equalizer. Tom played the role of Rob in Howard Korder's Search and Destroy on Broadway alongside Griffin Dunne. Tom appeared as Smittie in the film Light of Day (1987) opposite Michael J. Fox and Joan Jett, and was then cast as Al Capone, competing with actors like Harvey Keitel, for the film Gangland (1987) with Scott Glenn.

Waites moved to Iowa City, Iowa, to pursue a career as a playwright. While in Iowa, Tom wrote a play called Dark Laughter, based on the lives of William Faulkner and Dylan Thomas. The play was picked up by producer Barry Kemp, creator of the hit television series Coach. The play was moved to the Marin Theatre Center in Mill Valley, California.

Tom next relocated to Los Angeles where he started the theatre company, TomCats. This is where he began his directing career. After two guest star appearances on NYPD Blue and some minor roles in small independent films and television shows, including a guest star in Buffy the Vampire Slayer, Mike Hammer, Private Eye with Stacy Keach and Sliders. At this time, Tom established himself as a top acting teacher. He opened the TGW Acting Studio in 2000 and his school continues to thrive today. He has coached such actors as Alfred Molina, Vinnie Pastore, Vinessa Shaw, Tim Guinee, Oliver Hudson and Jamie Harris. TGW Acting Studio was named the top school to study acting in New York City by Backstage in 2015. Tom directs and produces Off-Off-Broadway plays at his studio. Upon returning to New York, he directed the Off-Broadway hit Six Goumbas and a Wannabe, starring Annie McGovern and Kathrine Narducci. He also directed Golden Ladder (with Amy Redford) and numerous other Off and Off-Off-Broadway productions.

Since returning to New York City he has landed guest roles in Law & Order (four times), Law & Order: Criminal Intent (two times) and starred in the soap opera One Life to Live as Decker Denton. Waites played Henry Stanton in Oz for four seasons.

Tom directed Joe Mantegna and Frances Fisher in a short film, Pandora's Box, for which he won Best Director in the Atlantic City Film Festival.

Filmography

Film

Television

Videogames

References

External links
 
 
 
 

1955 births
Living people
American male film actors
American male television actors
Male actors from Philadelphia
Juilliard School alumni
The New School alumni
University of Iowa alumni
20th-century American male actors
21st-century American male actors